The Dodge Charger III (or Charger 3) is a 1968 Dodge concept car.

It used  wheels and  front and  rear Super Stock racing tires.

The car seated two, in bucket seats, under a flip-up canopy with fixed windows, supported by struts when open. The steering wheel and instrument cluster swung aside to allow entry, while the seats elevated and lowered (by ) to ease access. The wheel and instrument cluster was from a 1968 Dodge Charger. Air was admitted to the cockpit through vents at the windshield base.

The engine bay would accept any Dodge V8, including the 426.

The exhaust exited through rectangular outlets under the rear lights, at the center of the car. The windshield was very steeply raked, and the hood had inlet vents. The deck had a small access door at the extreme rear. Headlights are hidden.

The car never entered production.

The body design was used in Funny Car by Al "Flying Dutchman" Vanderwoude in 1970.

Dodge Charger III in miniature 

A model of the Dodge Charger III was produced by Lesney Products as No 52 in the Matchbox 1-75 series from 1970 until its deletion in 1975.

Notes 

Cars introduced in 1968
Charger III
1960s cars
Individual cars